The commander of North American Aerospace Defense Command (NORAD) is a four-star general or admiral in the United States Armed Forces who serves as the head of all United States and Canadian joint aerospace military operational forces, stationed within the North American territories. The commander of NORAD concurrently serves as the commander of United States Northern Command and is the head of all U.S. military forces within the command's geographical area of responsibility. The commander of NORAD is nominated for appointment by the President of the United States and must be confirmed by the United States Senate. Prior to 2001, the title for the commander of NORAD was called the Commander-in-Chief of the North American Aerospace Defense Command. The commander of NORAD typically serves for two years.

List of deputy commanders 
In recent years deputy commanders have always been Canadian air force lieutenant generals. Prior to the 1968 unification of the Canadian Forces, the deputy commanders were RCAF Air Marshals.

References

North American Aerospace Defense Command
North American military personnel
Canadian air force generals and air marshals
Lists of military commanders